Mawe Mbili is a volcanic rock formation on the northern edge of the Elmenteita Badlands and within the Soysambu Conservancy, in Nakuru County of Rift Valley Province, southern Kenya.

The Elmenteita Badlands are a Holocene Epoch volcanic lava flow. One of the stones has a cavity at the base of it, large enough to sit in and used in times past as a shelter in bad weather for herdsmen looking after cattle in the area.

The monoliths are in a natural clearing in the lleleshwa (Tarchonanthus camphoratus) shrublands. In the area there are occasional Elephant's toothbrush (Cussonia spicata) and Fig trees (Ficus spp.).

Features
The Sleeping Warrior Eco Lodge stands high on Mawe Mbili.

Nearby there is a hot water borehole and a Japanese style hot bathing facility.

The route of the 2007, 2008, and 2009 Safari rally passed through the clearing outside the preserve, as it led from the boundary of the Elmenteita Badlands and Delamere Estates on Soysambu Ranch, around the back of Scout Hat Hill, and past a helicopter landing marker built by the British forces in 1955 during the Mau Mau rebellion.

References

External links
Sleeping Warrior Lodge.com: About the Soysambu Conservancy 

Rock formations of Kenya
Volcanoes of Kenya
Landforms of Rift Valley Province
Nakuru County
Holocene volcanism
Quaternary Africa